Jakub Cezary Iskra (born 13 August 2002) is a Polish professional footballer who plays as a right-back for Polish club Sandecja Nowy Sącz.

Career 
On 27 July 2020, he made his Serie A debut in a 1–1 home draw against Torino.

On 30 August 2021, he joined Śląsk Wrocław on loan that ended on 9 June 2022. During his spell with Polish club, he featured in eight Ekstraklasa games and one Polish Cup fixture. He did not score any goals.

On 11 July 2022, he returned to Poland yet again to join I liga club Sandecja Nowy Sącz on a two-year deal with an extension option.

Career statistics

Club

References

2002 births
Living people
Polish footballers
Poland youth international footballers
Polish expatriate footballers
Association football defenders
Serie A players
Ekstraklasa players
I liga players
II liga players
Pogoń Szczecin players
S.P.A.L. players
Śląsk Wrocław players
Sandecja Nowy Sącz players
Polish expatriate sportspeople in Italy
Expatriate footballers in Italy